The tidyverse is a collection of open source packages for the R programming language introduced by Hadley Wickham and his team that "share an underlying design philosophy, grammar, and data structures" of tidy data. Characteristic features of tidyverse packages include extensive use of non-standard evaluation and encouraging piping.

As of November 2018, the tidyverse package and some of its individual packages comprise 5 out of the top 10 most downloaded R packages. The tidyverse is the subject of multiple books and papers. In 2019, the ecosystem has been published in the Journal of Open Source Software.

Critics of the tidyverse have argued it promotes tools that are harder to teach and learn than their base-R equivalents and are too dissimilar to other programming languages. On the other hand, some have argued that tidyverse is a very effective way to introduce complete beginners into programming, as pedagogically it allows students to quickly begin doing powerful data processing tasks.

Packages
The core packages, which provide functionality to model, transform, and visualize data, include:
 ggplot2
 dplyr
 tidyr
 readr
 purrr 
 tibble 
 stringr
 forcats

Additional packages assist the core collection. Other packages based on the tidy data principles are regularly developed, such as tidytext for text analysis, tidymodels for machine learning, or tidyquant for financial operations.

References 

Data analysis software
Statistical software
Free R (programming language) software